Saus is a settlement in the municipality of the Saus, Camallera i Llampaies in the comarca of Alt Empordà, Girona, Catalonia, Spain.

References

Saus, Camallera i Llampaies